George Oliver Curme, Sr. (January 14, 1860 – April 29, 1948) was an American grammarian and philologist. He is known for writing Grammar of the German Language (1905, revised 1922), and A Grammar of the English Language (1931)''.

References
 George O. Curme -- Britannica Online Encyclopedia at www.britannica.com
 Guide to the George Oliver Curme, Sr. (1860-1948) Collected Papers at the Northwestern University Library

External links
 

1860 births
1948 deaths
DePauw University alumni
University of Michigan alumni
Cornell College faculty
Northwestern University faculty
University of Southern California faculty
Linguists from the United States
American grammarians
Linguists of English
Linguists of German
Presidents of the Modern Language Association